Events in the year 1835 in Portugal.

Incumbents

Monarch: Mary II
Prime Minister: 
Pedro de Sousa Holstein (until 4 May)
Vitório Maria de Sousa Coutinho (4 May – 27 May)
João Carlos de Saldanha Oliveira e Daun (27 May – 18 November)
José Jorge Loureiro (18 November – )

Events
 18 April – The newspaper Açoriano Oriental was established

Titles created

12 May – Baron of São Cosme, a title in the Portuguese nobility
23 May – Viscount of Torre de Moncorvo, a title created by Queen Maria II as a barony by decree
21 July – Viscount of Banho, an hereditary title created by Queen Maria II 
17 September – Viscount of Vilarinho de São Romão, a title created by Queen Maria II

Births

30 January – António Lopes Mendes, explorer and agronomist (d. 1894)
10 November – Manuel António de Sousa, Portuguese merchant and military officer of Goan origin (d. 1892).

Full date missing

Delfim Modesto Brandão, "Juiz" (head of state) of the Couto Misto

Deaths
28 March – Auguste, Duke of Leuchtenberg, the first prince consort of Maria II of Portugal (b. 1810)

References

 
1830s in Portugal
Portugal
Years of the 19th century in Portugal
Portugal